MTL may refer to:

 An abbreviation and nickname for the city of Montréal, Quebec
 The Montreal Canadiens, a National Hockey League (NHL) team based in Montreal, Quebec
 C.F. Montréal, a Major League Soccer team based in Montréal. 
 The Montréal Alouettes, a Canadian Football League (CFL) team based in Montréal, Quebec.
 An abbreviation of Mount Laurel Township, New Jersey
 The official abbreviation for the Muldentalkreis district in the Free State of Saxony, Germany
 The ISO 4217 code for the Maltese lira, the former currency of Malta
 Modern Taiwanese Language, an orthography in the Latin alphabet for the Taiwanese language
 First language or mother tongue language
 Master of Teaching and Learning postgraduate degree
 Mary Todd Lincoln (1818–1882), wife of Abraham Lincoln and the First Lady of the United States 
 Maitland Airport in Australia
 Mortlake railway station in London, England (National Rail station code)
 RAF-Avia, ICAO code
 An initialism for Military Training Leader
 Marc Tessier-Lavigne, the 11th and current President of Stanford University

Science and technology 
 Machine translation, often abbreviated as "MTL"
 Material Template Library, a 3D graphics format that describes the material(s) for an accompanying OBJ file
 Matrix Template Library, a linear algebra library for C++ programs
 Microsystems Technology Laboratories at the Massachusetts Institute of Technology
 Model transformation language, a generic term for various languages to perform transformations on mathematical models
 Monoidal t-norm logic, the logic of left-continuous t-norms
 Japan Median Tectonic Line, Japan's largest seismic fault system
 Medial temporal lobe, a brain region involved in learning and memory
 Merged transistor logic
 Metric temporal logic
Multi-task Learning
MTL Harbor Tugboats

Products and companies 
 Modern Terminals Limited, a container terminal operator in Hong Kong
 MTL (transport company), a former Merseyside-based bus, coach and train operator in the United Kingdom
 MTL Instruments Group